Year 1153 (MCLIII) was a common year starting on Thursday (link will display the full calendar) of the Julian calendar.

Events 
 By place 

 Byzantine Empire 
 Spring – Andronikos Komnenos, son of Isaac Komnenos, is imprisoned in the imperial palace for conspiring against his uncle, Emperor Manuel I (Komenenos) at Constantinople.

 Levant 
 August 19 – Siege of Ascalon: King Baldwin III of Jerusalem captures Ascalon, the last Fatimid fortress in Palestine. The citizens are allowed to leave in peace and return to Egypt.
 Raynald of Châtillon, a French nobleman, marries Constance of Antioch (after given permission by Baldwin III) and becomes Prince of Antioch.

 England 
 Spring – The 19-year-old Henry of Anjou lands with a Norman fleet (some 40 ships) on the south coast of England. He defeats King Stephen (a cousin of his mother, Queen Matilda) with a small army at Malmesbury. Henry travels north through the Midlands, while a temporary truce is accepted. Robert de Beaumont, 2nd Earl of Leicester, announces his support for the cause. Hoping to dethrone Stephen and replace him with Matilda.
 May 24 – King David I dies after a 29-year reign at Carlisle Castle. He is succeeded by his grandson, the 12-year-old Malcolm IV (Virgo). Malcolm is the eldest son of Henry, 3rd Earl of Huntingdon, who is crowned as ruler of Scotland at Scone Priory on May 27. Because of his young age, Donnchad (or Duncan) becomes Malcolm's regent and royal adviser.
 August – Stephen assemble troops to renew the siege of Wallingford Castle in a final attempt to take the stronghold. Henry of Anjou marches south to relieve the siege, arriving with a small army of mercenaries. He places Stephen's besieging troops under siege themselves. Stephen agrees to make a truce and accepts Henry as heir to the English throne.
 November 6 – The Treaty of Wallingford: Henry of Anjou and Stephen ratify the terms of a permanent peace under the direction of Archbishop Theobald of Bec. Ending the civil war (The Anarchy) – between England and Normandy after 18-years. The treaty grants the throne to Stephen for the duration of his life, but makes Henry the heir apparent.

 Europe 
 Confronted with important financial difficulty due to the expenses of the Spanish crusade, the Republic of Genoa has to sell a third of the city of Tortosa (which they had conquered in 1148 during an expedition against the Almoravids) to Ramon Berenguer IV, count of Barcelona.

 Asia 
 February 10 – Taira no Tadamori dies after a career in which he has used his military and diplomatic skills to subdue the pirates menacing commerce in the Seto Inland Sea. He expands trade with China and becomes the first samurai to serve Emperor Konoe as personal bodyguard. He is succeeded by his son Taira no Kiyomori, who assumes control of the Taira Clan. He establishes the first samurai-dominated government in Japan.

 Africa 
 King Roger II sends a Sicilian expedition under Admiral Philip of Mahdia to conquer Ifriqiya. With the support of Muslim troops, the Siculo-Normans suppress a rebellion on Djerba and invade the Kerkennah Islands.

 By topic 

 Demography 
 Estimation: Constantinople, capital of the Byzantine Empire, becomes the largest city of the world, taking the lead from Merv in the Seljuk Empire.

 Religion 
 July 8 – Pope Eugene III dies after a 8-year pontificate at Tivoli. He is succeeded by Anastasius IV as the 168th pope of the Catholic Church.
 Dhovemi, ruler of the Maldives, converts to Islam and adopts the Muslim title of Sultan Muhammad ibn Abdullah.

Births 
 August 17 – William IX, count of Poitiers (d. 1156)
 Abu Mohammed Salih, Almohad Sufi leader (d. 1234)
 Aimery of Cyprus (or Amaury), king of Jerusalem (d. 1205)
 Alexios III (Angelos), Byzantine emperor (d. 1211)
 Cathal Crobhdearg Ua Conchobair, Irish king (d. 1224)
 Fujiwara no Kanefusa, Japanese nobleman (d. 1217)
 Harvey I of Léon, Breton nobleman and knight (d. 1203)
 Ibn Hammad, Hammadid historian and writer (d. 1230)
 Kamo no Chōmei, Japanese author and poet (d. 1216)
 Marco I Sanudo, duke of the Archipelago (d. 1227)
 Nerses of Lambron, Armenian archbishop (d. 1198)
 Richard de Clare, 3rd Earl of Hertford (d. 1217)
 Sibylla of Acerra, queen and regent of Sicily  (d. 1205)
 Waleran de Beaumont, 4th Earl of Warwick (d. 1204)
 William II (the Good), king of Sicily (d. 1189)

Deaths 
 January 28 – Pelagius of Oviedo, Spanish bishop
 February 10 – Taira no Tadamori, Japanese samurai (b. 1096)
 April 16 – Piotr Włostowic, Polish nobleman (b. 1080)
 May 22 – Atto of Pistoia, Portuguese bishop (b. 1070)
 May 24 – David I, king of Scotland (b. 1084)
 June 12 – Roger de Beaumont, 2nd Earl of Warwick
 June 29 – Óláfr Guðrøðarson, king of the Isles
 July 8 – Eugene III, pope of the Catholic Church
 August 16 – Bernard de Tremelay, French Grand Master 
 August 17 – Eustace IV, count of Boulogne (b. 1130)
 August 20 – Bernard of Clairvaux, French abbot (b. 1090)
 September 3 – Henry I, German archbishop (b. 1080)
 October 14 – Henry Murdac, English archbishop
 December 16 – Ranulf de Gernon, Norman nobleman (b. 1099)
 Al-Shahrastani, Persian scholar and historian (b. 1086)
 Anna Komnene, Byzantine princess and historian (b. 1083)
 Gampopa, Tibetan Buddhist monk and teacher (b. 1079) 
 Shaykh Tabarsi, Persian Shia scholar and writer (b. 1073)
 Simon II de Senlis, 4th Earl of Huntingdon (b. 1098)
 Walter Espec, Norman nobleman and High Sheriff

References